Qiantong is a town in Yanshan County in southeastern Hebei province, China, situated around  north of the border with Shandong and  south-southwest of the county seat. , it has 29 villages under its administration.

See also 
 List of township-level divisions of Hebei

References 

Township-level divisions of Hebei